{{DISPLAYTITLE:C10H14O4}}
The molecular formula C10H14O4 (molar mass: 198.22 g/mol, exact mass: 198.0892 u) may refer to:

 7-Deoxyloganetic acid
 Ethylene glycol dimethacrylate
 Tetraacetylethane
 Guaifenesin